Roy McPipe (born May 5, 1951) is a former American professional basketball player.

McPipe was born in Hammond, Indiana. A 6'3" guard from Eastern Montana College, McPipe played professional basketball with the American Basketball Association's Utah Stars in 1975, although his career consisted of only five regular-season ABA games. He had previously been drafted by the NBA in both 1973 (with the Los Angeles Lakers) and in 1974 (with the Washington Bullets) but decided to stay in school.

McPipe still holds the career scoring records of total points, points per game, and total field goals at Eastern Montana College (now known as Montana State University-Billings).

References

External links
Career stats at basketball-reference.com

1951 births
Living people
American men's basketball players
Basketball players from Indiana
Junior college men's basketball players in the United States
Los Angeles Lakers draft picks
Montana State Billings Yellowjackets men's basketball players
Shooting guards
Sportspeople from Hammond, Indiana
Utah Stars players
Washington Bullets draft picks